David Eldred Holt (November 27, 1843 – November 5, 1925) was an Episcopalian clergy.  He is known for a memoir that he wrote about his experiences as a soldier in the Confederate States Army during the American Civil War.

References

"A Mississippi Rebel in the Army of Northern Virginia:  The Civil War Memoirs of David Holt," 1995, Edited by Thomas D. Cockrell and Michael B. Ballard, .
"A Genealogical History of the Holt Family in the United States (more particularly the descendants of Nicholas Holt of Newbury and Andover Mass. 1634-1644, and of William Holt of New Haven, Conn," Chapter 1, The Holt Family of Virginia, 1864, Albany, NY.

American Episcopal clergy
1843 births
1925 deaths